Madonna di Campagna is a quarter of Turin, Piedmont, Italy, and a subway station on Turin's Airport Line.

References

Turin Metro stations

Districts of Turin